Omranabad may refer to:
 Omranabad, Ardabil